Surrey Hills may refer to:

Surrey Hills AONB - an Area of Outstanding Natural Beauty in Surrey, England
Surrey Hills (TV Programme) - reality T.V programme
Surry Hills, New South Wales - a suburb of Sydney, Australia
Surrey Hills, Victoria - a suburb of Melbourne, Australia
Surrey Hills railway station